Victory's Short  is a 2014 black comedy short film directed by Mika'ela Fisher and co-directed by Benjamin Feitelson.

Premise
After nine years without celebrating their wedding anniversary, Gabrielle Montvignier, heir of a fortune in decline, is invited by her husband to a supper to make up for the past nine years. What she doesn't know is that he has planned to eliminate her during this strange supper.

Cast
 Benjamin Feitelson as Montvignier
 Mika'ela Fisher as Gabrielle Montvignier
 France  Péleau as Policewoman
 François Guibert as Policeman

About the film
The film is mainly supported by dialogues, and the two protagonists throw the words like in a ping pong game. A Kammerspiel , filmed in black and white which reminds of an Alfred Hitchcock movie of the 1950s.

Festivals 
 Cannes Film Festival 2014 
 Milan International Film Festival Awards MIFF 2015

Awards 
 Nomination (Best Short Film) Milan International Film Festival Awards  2015

Production 
The film started a theatrical run on December 16, 2015 at Studio Galande in Paris.

External links 
 
 Unifrance Victory's Short
 Homepage Victory's Short
 Official Trailer  Victory's Short
 Interview televisionet  Nomination Victory's Short

References

2014 films
French drama short films
French black comedy films
Films directed by Mika'ela Fisher
French black-and-white films
2010s English-language films
2010s French films